Gaius Petronius Arbiter (c. AD 27 – 66; sometimes Titus Petronius Niger) was a Roman courtier during the reign of Nero. He is generally believed to be the author of the Satyricon, a satirical novel believed to have been written during the Neronian era (54–68 AD). He is one of the most important characters in Henryk Sienkiewicz' historical novel Quo Vadis (1895). Leo Genn portrays him in the 1951 film of the same name.

Life
A reference to Petronius by Sidonius Apollinaris places him and/or his Satyricon in Massalia (ancient Marseille). He might have been born and educated there. Tacitus, Plutarch and Pliny the Elder describe Petronius as the elegantiae arbiter (also phrased arbiter elegantiarum), "judge of elegance", in the court of the emperor Nero. He served as suffect consul in 62. Later, he became a member of the senatorial class who devoted himself to a life of pleasure. His relationship to Nero was apparently akin to that of a fashion advisor.

Tacitus gives this account of Petronius in his historical work the Annals (XVI.18):

None of the ancient sources give any further detail about his life, or mention that he was a writer. However, a medieval manuscript written around 1450 of the Satyricon credited a "Titus Petronius" as the author of the original work. Traditionally, this reference is linked with Petronius Arbiter, since the novel appears to have been written or at least set during his lifetime. The link, however, remains speculative and disputed.

As a writer
Petronius' development of his characters in the Satyricon, namely Trimalchio, transcends the traditional style of writing of ancient literature. In the literature written during Petronius' lifetime, the emphasis was always on the typical considerations of plot, which had been laid down by classical rules. The character, which was hardly known in ancient literature, was secondary. Petronius goes beyond these literary limitations in his exact portrayals of detailed speech, behaviour, surroundings, and appearance of the characters.

Another literary device Petronius employs in his novel is a collection of specific allusions. The allusions to certain people and events are evidence that the Satyricon was written during Nero's time. These also suggest that it was aimed at a contemporary audience which consisted in part of Nero's courtiers and even Nero himself.

One such allusion, found in chapter 9, refers to the story of the good wife Lucretia which was well known at the time:

The message Petronius tries to convey in his work is far from moral and does not intend to produce reform, but is written above all to entertain and should be considered artistically. Nevertheless, his writings can be a valuable tool to better comprehend the customs and ways of life of Roman society at that particular time, since the author strives to preserve the plausibility of his representation, as can be noted by the frequent use of allusions and detailed descriptions of characters and behaviours. As the title implies, the Satyricon is a satire, specifically a Menippean satire, in which Petronius satirizes nearly anything, using his taste as the only standard. It is speculated that Petronius' depiction of Trimalchio mirrors that of Nero. Although the author's own opinion is never alluded to, the opinions of the characters involved in the story are evident, as is how Encolpius criticizes Trimalchio.

Death
Petronius' high position soon made him the object of envy for those around him. Having attracted the jealousy of Tigellinus, the commander of the emperor's guard, he was accused of treason. He was arrested at Cumae in 65 AD but did not wait for a sentence. Instead, he chose to take his own life. Tacitus again records his elegant suicide in the sixteenth book of the Annals:

According to Pliny the Elder: "T. Petronius, a consular, when he was going to die through Nero's jealousy and envy, broke his fluorspar wine-dipper so that the emperor's table would not inherit it. It had cost 300,000 sesterces". T. Petronius and G. Petronius have been said to have been the same man.

See also

 Asteroid 3244 Petronius, named after the satirist
 Glossarium Eroticum
 Supplements to the Satyricon

Notes

Further reading
 Breitenstein, Natalie, Petronius, Satyrica 1–15. Text, Übersetzung, Kommentar (2009. Berlin – New York: De Gruyter) (Texte und Kommentare, 32).
 Conte, Gian Biagio, The Hidden Author: An Interpretation of Petronius' Satyricon (1997. Berkeley: University of California Press).
 Connors, Catherine, Petronius the Poet: Verse and Literary Tradition in the Satyricon (1998. Cambridge: Cambridge University Press).
 Habermehl, Peter, Petronius, Satyrica 79–141. Ein philologisch–literarischer Kommentar. Band I: Satyrica 79–110. Berlin: de Gruyter. 2006.
 Habermehl, Peter, Petronius, Satyrica 79–141. Ein philologisch–literarischer Kommentar. Band II: Satyrica 111–118. Berlin: de Gruyter. 2020.
 Habermehl, Peter, Petronius, Satyrica 79–141. Ein philologisch–literarischer Kommentar. Band III: Bellum civile (Sat. 119–124). Berlin: de Gruyter. 2021.
 Jensson, Gottskalk, The Recollections of Encolpius. The Satyrica of Petronius as Milesian Fiction (2004. Groningen: Barkhuis Publishing and Groningen University Library) (Ancient narrative Suppl. 2).
 Prag, Jonathan and Ian Repath (eds), Petronius: A Handbook (2009. Oxford: Wiley-Blackwell).
 Reeve, Michael D. 1983. Petronius. In Texts and Transmission: A Survey of the Latin Classics. Edited by Leighton D. Reynolds, 295–300. Oxford: Clarendon.
 Repath, Ian. 2010. "Plato in Petronius: Petronius in Platanona". The Classical Quarterly, 60(2), new series, 577–595.
 Rose, Kenneth F. C. 1971. "The Date and Author of the Satyricon". Mnemosyne, Bibliotheca Classica Batava, Supplementum 16. Leiden, The Netherlands: E. J. Brill.
 Schmeling, Gareth. 2011. A Commentary on the Satyrica of Petronius. Oxford: Oxford Univ. Press.
 Slater, Niall W. 1990. Reading Petronius. Baltimore and London: The Johns Hopkins University Press.
 Sullivan, John P. 1985. "Petronius' Satyricon and its Neronian Context". In Aufstieg und Niedergang der römischen Welt: Geschichte und Kultur Roms im Spiegel der neuren Forschung, Vol. II, Part 32.3. Edited by Hildegard Temporini and Wolfgang Haase, 1666–1686. Berlin: Walter de Gruyter.
 Vannini, Giulio, Petronius 1975–2005: bilancio critico e nuove proposte (2007. Goettingen: Vandenhoeck & Ruprecht) (Lustrum, 49).
 Vannini, Giulio, Petronii Arbitri Satyricon 100–115. Edizione critica e commento (2010. Berlin – New York: De Gruyter) (Beiträge zur Altertumskunde, 281).

External links

 
 
 
 Works by Petronius at Perseus Digital Library
 
 
 
 Latin text of the Satyricon from The Latin Library
 Petronii satirae et liber priapeorum, iterum edidit Franciscus Buecheler, adiectae sunt Varronis et Senecae satirae similesque reliquiae, Berolini apud Weidmannos, 1871.

20s births
Year of birth uncertain
66 deaths
Suffect consuls of Imperial Rome
Ancient Romans who committed suicide
Classical Latin novelists
Ancient Roman poets
Silver Age Latin writers
Suicides by sharp instrument in Italy
1st-century Romans
1st-century writers
Ancient Roman satirists
Petronii
Ancient Massaliotes